Apocalypse Soon is an extended play (EP) by American electronic dance music band Major Lazer. It was released in 2014 after the success of their 2013 studio album Free the Universe.

The EP includes 5 tracks featuring collaborations with a number of artists, notably Sean Paul and Pharrell Williams in addition to Machel Montano, RDX, Moska and Mr. Fox.

The song "Come On to Me" featuring Sean Paul charted in France and the Netherlands, whereas the track "Aerosol Can" featuring Pharrell Williams charted in Australia and Belgium. The EP itself charted in France and New Zealand.

Track listing

 The EP also contains a digital booklet of the release

Charts

References

2014 EPs
Major Lazer albums
Albums produced by Major Lazer